Rewind (Find a Way) was the second single to be released of Beverley Knight's second studio album, Prodigal Sista. After the success of the first single Made It Back, which peaked at #21 in UK Singles Chart, the follow-up proved to be disappointing after it peaked at #40.

The accompanying video for the single was one of the first videos by acclaimed director Dawn Shadforth.

Track list
CD 1
"Rewind (Find a Way)"
"The Need Of You" (live from Radio 1's Smokin' Room Session)
"Do Right Woman, Do Right Man" (live from Radio 1's Smokin' Room Session)

CD 2
"Rewind (Find A Way)"
"Rewind (Find A Way)" (Dodge's Master mix)
"Rewind (Find A Way)" (Erick Sermon mix)

Charts

Personnel
Written by Beverley Knight, Neville Thomas and Pule Pheto
Lyrics written by Beverley Knight
Melody created by Beverley Knight
Produced and arranged by Neville Thomas and Pule Pheto
All vocals performed and arranged by Beverley Knight
Mixed by Pete Mocran
Recorded at 2B3 Akoustics & Battery Studios

See also
Beverley Knight discography

Beverley Knight songs
1998 songs
Songs written by Beverley Knight
Songs written by Pule Pheto
Songs written by Neville Thomas